Guo Gan (born November 15, 1968) is an erhu master from Shenyang, China, now based in Paris, France. Gan was recognized as a Knight of the Order of Arts and Letters in 2016. He is the world's first Chinese national folk musician’s recipient, and the world's first Chinese erhu performer to win the award.

Biography 

Guo Gan started to learn the erhu at the age of four, and was taught by his father, Guo Junming, a famous erhu soloist. Guo Gan was fascinated by western instruments and rounded out his studies by taking up the violin, the cello and the piano while in secondary school (1981-1987). When he was sixteen, he accompanied his father on tour, playing more than 100 concerts in a presentation entitled “Duo for the two-stringed vielle”. In 1987 he entered the Shenyang Music Conservatory and in 1991 won a prize with honours for his work on the erhu. At the same time, he studied Chinese and Western percussion instruments and gave a jazz concert for percussion and piano. In 1992, he won first prize in the traditional-music competition in the Lioning Province, and in 1995, he was named professor of erhu and percussion at the Conservatory of Liaoning Province. The same year, he was one of the founders of a jazz group, GYQ, which is well known in China.

Guo Gan moved to Paris, France, in 2000, and obtained a master's degree in percussion from the National Music School of Fresnes.  In 2002, he was invited by Gabriel Yared to play in a recording of the music for the film “L’Idole”. He has played in nearly 3000 concerts and published more than 80 albums. He played with many of the world's most famous musician including Lang Lang, Yvan Cassar, Didier Lockwood, Hans Zimmer, Jean Francois Zygel, Gabriel Yared, Nguyen Le and many others.

Discography 

 Paris–Istanbul–Shanghai (with Joel Grare, 2008)
 In One Take (with Fiona Sze, 2010)
 Marco Polo  (with Mathias Duplessy, Enkhjargal Dandarvaanchig, Sabir Khan. 2010)
 Jiangnan Sizhu Music (with Lingling Yu, 2011)
 Scented Maiden (2012)
 Nen Nen Sui Sui (with Mieko Miyazaki, 2012)
 Jasmine Flower – Guo Gan Trio (2013)
 Himalaya (2014)
 The Kite  (with Loup Barrow. 2015)
 Crazy Horse (with Mathias Duplessy, Enkhjargal Dandarvaanchig, Aliocha Regnard. 2015)
 Peace In The World (with Aly Keita, 2016)
 Moon Night (2018)
 Gobi Desert – Guo Gan Trio (2019)
 Saba Sounds (with Zoumana Tereta, Richard Bourreau. 2020)
 Brothers of String (with Mathias Duplessy, Enkhjargal Dandarvaanchig, Aliocha Regnard. 2020)

Notes

References

External links

Musicians from Shenyang
Erhu players
1968 births
Living people
Chinese expatriates in France
Chevaliers of the Ordre des Arts et des Lettres